Kim Ga-Eul (born January 17, 1997, in Pohang) is a South Korean swimmer, who specialized in long-distance freestyle events. She is a finalist in the 800 m freestyle at the 2010 Asian Games in Guangzhou.

Kim qualified for the women's 400 m freestyle, as South Korea's youngest swimmer (aged 15), at the 2012 Summer Olympics in London, by eclipsing a FINA B-standard entry time of 4:15.01 from the Dong-A Swimming Tournament in Ulsan. She challenged seven other swimmers on the second heat, including three-time Olympian Kristel Köbrich of Chile. Kim finished the race in last place by nearly 25 seconds behind Singapore's Lynette Lim, posting the second-slowest time of 4:43.46. Kim failed to advance into the final, as she placed thirty-fourth overall in the preliminary heats.

References

External links
NBC Olympics Profile

1997 births
Living people
Olympic swimmers of South Korea
Swimmers at the 2012 Summer Olympics
Swimmers at the 2010 Asian Games
Swimmers at the 2014 Asian Games
South Korean female freestyle swimmers
People from Pohang
Asian Games competitors for South Korea
Sportspeople from North Gyeongsang Province
21st-century South Korean women